Christopher Lee Mack (born December 30, 1969) is an American college basketball coach and the former head coach at the University of Louisville and Xavier University.

Background
Chris Mack was born in Cleveland, Ohio and grew up in North College Hill, Ohio, a suburb of Cincinnati. He graduated in 1988 from St. Xavier High School in Cincinnati, where he was named 1987–88 Cincinnati Post Metro Player of the Year.

Mack continued on to the University of Evansville, where he played basketball for two seasons.  He then transferred to Xavier University in 1990, where he played his final two seasons of eligibility (after redshirting one for transfer rules), and graduated in 1992 with a B.A. in Communication Arts.
He is married to the former Christi Hester, a Louisville native and former University of Dayton guard (1996–2000). They have three children and resided in Northern Kentucky before he took the Louisville position.

Coaching career

High school
Mack started his coaching career as junior varsity head coach at McAuley High School, an all-girls high school in Cincinnati, in 1993. In 1995, Mack was named head coach of the girls varsity basketball team at Mount Notre Dame High School in Reading, Ohio, where he received the 1996 Coach of the Year award from the Cincinnati Post.

College

Xavier and Wake Forest
In 1999, he was named Director of Basketball Operations at Xavier University, serving under the late Skip Prosser, whom he followed as an assistant coach to Wake Forest in 2001.

Return to Xavier
In 2004 Mack returned to Xavier, joining new head coach Sean Miller as his top assistant.

Head coach at Xavier
When Miller moved to the University of Arizona in 2009, on April 15, 2009 it was announced that Mack would replace Miller as Xavier head coach. The first top 25 ranking by a Mack-led Xavier team was March 1, 2010 when it made its season debut in the Associated Press Poll at #25. During that season, the Jordan Crawford-led Musketeers won the Atlantic 10 Conference and advanced to the NCAA Sweet 16. The Musketeers had question marks heading into the next season, yet Mack guided the team to its fifth consecutive Atlantic 10 Championship before falling to Marquette in the first round of the NCAA tournament. During both of these years Mack earned Atlantic 10 Coach of the Year awards. Heading into the 2011–2012 campaign the Musketeers were slated to be one of the top teams in the country. With senior All-American Tu Holloway returning, Mack and Xavier were on the cusp of a special year. Xavier got off to a good start and were ranked as high as #7 before a bench-clearing brawl with their in-city rival Cincinnati Bearcats derailed the Musketeers. Mack's squad did not win the Atlantic 10 Tournament title in 2012 but was able to advance to the NCAA Sweet 16 with wins over Notre Dame and Lehigh. Since Xavier joined the reconfigured Big East for the 2013–14 season, it has continued to build upon the success attained in the A-10 making the Sweet Sixteen for a third time in six years during the 2014–15 season while attaining regular Top 25 rankings. Mack won several national coach of the year awards following the 2015–16 season in which Xavier finished 28–6, including the Hank Iba Award. The Musketeers had the highest preseason ranking in school history of 7th (Associated Press) under Mack prior to the 2016–17. After overcoming multiple injuries to key players Xavier went on a tremendous run defeating 6th seeded Maryland, 3rd seeded Florida State and 2nd seeded Arizona landing in the Elite Eight for the third time in school history. On January 18, 2018 Mack passed former Xavier head coach Pete Gillen and became the all-time leader in Xavier coaching wins after defeating St. Johns 88–82. Mack eventually would lead his 2018 Xavier squad to the school's first No. 1 seed, becoming the 1-seed in the NCAA Tournament's West Region. The team would eventually bow out of the tournament in the second round to Florida State, losing 75–70 to the West Region's 9-seed. Xavier finished the 2018 season with a 29–6 record.

University of Louisville

On March 27, 2018, Mack agreed to terms on a seven-year contract worth about $4 million annually to become the next head coach at the University of Louisville. In December 2019 Mack’s Louisville basketball team was ranked #1 in the country for two weeks before stumbling and losing 3 out of 5 games. In January 2020 the team recovered to beat #3 ranked Duke in a statement win.

Mack was suspended from the first six games of the 2021–22 season. The university claimed that Mack violated the school's guidelines while dealing with former assistant coach Dino Gaudio's extortion attempts. Unbeknownst to Gaudio, Mack recorded the conversation in which he fired the assistant coach and was threatened by Gaudio for doing so. On January 26, 2022, it was announced that Mack was out as head coach of the University of Louisville.

Head coaching record

References

1969 births
Living people
American men's basketball coaches
American men's basketball players
Basketball coaches from Ohio
Basketball players from Cleveland
College men's basketball head coaches in the United States
Evansville Purple Aces men's basketball players
High school basketball coaches in the United States
Louisville Cardinals men's basketball coaches
People from North College Hill, Ohio
Sportspeople from Cleveland
St. Xavier High School (Ohio) alumni
Wake Forest Demon Deacons men's basketball coaches
Xavier Musketeers men's basketball coaches
Xavier Musketeers men's basketball players